Rameswaram is a village in the Kakinada district of Andhra Pradesh, India. The village is situated 5 kilometres west to the district headquarters Kakinada.

Geography
The 82-degrees east longitude passes through the place. It has an elevation of 4 metres (13 ft) above sea level.

It is situated 5 km to the west of district headquarters Kakinada and 60 km to the east of the city of Rajahmundry.

Governance 
The area falls under Rameswaram Panchayati. The village falls under Anaparthy Assembly constituency and Rajahmundry Lok Sabha constituency.

Transport 
The nearest domestic airport is the Rajahmundry Airport at a distance of 60 km and the nearest international airport is the Visakhapatnam Airport at a distance of 160 km. The nearest railway stations are the Kakinada Town railway station and Samalkot Junction railway station.

Education 
Primary and secondary education is provided by government and private schools, overseen by the state's School Education Department. Instruction is delivered in English and Telugu.

References

Villages in Kakinada district